Andrew Simpkins (April 29, 1932 – June 2, 1999) was an American jazz bassist.

Born in Richmond, Indiana, he first became known as a member of the group The Three Sounds, with which he performed from 1956 to 1968. After that, until 1974, he was a member of pianist George Shearing's group, and from 1979 to 1989 toured with singer Sarah Vaughan. Throughout and after that time, during which he settled in Los Angeles, Simpkins became respected as a top-quality bassist and widely known as a solid and reliable studio musician. He performed with singers Carmen McRae and Anita O'Day, instrumentalists Gerald Wiggins, Monty Alexander, Buddy DeFranco, Don Menza, and Stéphane Grappelli, and many others. He recorded three albums as a leader.
He also played acoustic bass on the 1997 covers album In a Metal Mood: No More Mr. Nice Guy by artist Pat Boone.

Simpkins died of stomach cancer in Los Angeles.

Discography
With The Three Sounds
1958: Introducing the 3 Sounds 
1958: Branching Out with Nat Adderley
1959: Bottoms Up! 
1959: LD + 3 with Lou Donaldson
1959: Good Deal
1960: Moods  
1960: Feelin' Good 
1960: Here We Come
1960: It Just Got to Be
1960: Blue Hour with Stanley Turrentine
1961: Hey There 
1961: Babe's Blues 
1962: Out of This World 
1962: Black Orchid 
1959/62: Standards released 1998
1962: Blue Genes
1962: Anita O'Day & the Three Sounds with Anita O'Day
1963: The Three Sounds Play Jazz on Broadway 
1963: Some Like It Modern  
1964: Live at the Living Room   
1964: Three Moods     
1965: Beautiful Friendship 
1966: Today's Sounds 
1966: Vibrations 
1967: Live at the Lighthouse
1968: Coldwater Flat
1968: Elegant Soul

With Pat Boone
In a Metal Mood: No More Mr. Nice Guy (Hip-O,1997)
With Kenny Burrell
Up the Street, 'Round the Corner, Down the Block (Fantasy, 1974)
Heritage (AudioSource, 1980)
With Benny Carter
My Kind of Trouble (Pablo, 1989)
With Natalie Cole
 Unforgettable... with Love (Elektra, 1991)
With Teddy Edwards
Blue Saxophone (Verve/Gitanes, 1992 [1993])
With Victor Feldman
Merry Olde Soul (Riverside, 1961)
With Robert Palmer
 Ridin' High (EMI, 1992)
With Lalo Schifrin
Ins and Outs (Palo Alto, 1982)
With George Shearing and Stéphane Grappelli
The Reunion (MPS, 1976)With Mary StallingsSpectrum (Concord, 1996)With Toni TennilleMore Than You Know (Mirage, 1984)
Do It Again (USA Music Group, 1988)With Sarah VaughanThe Duke Ellington Songbook, Vol. 1 (Pablo, 1979)
Copacabana (Pablo, 1979)
Send in the Clowns (Pablo, 1981)
Crazy and Mixed Up (Pablo, 1982)
Gershwin Live! (Columbia, 1982)With Joe Williams and George Shearing'The Heart and Soul of Joe Williams and George Shearing (Sheba, 1971)

References

External links
 Lees, Gene. "Andy Simpkins". (Web site all about jazz)
 [ Yanow, Scott. "Andy Simpkins". (Web site allmusic'')]

American jazz double-bassists
Male double-bassists
1932 births
1999 deaths
Deaths from stomach cancer
Musicians from Richmond, Indiana
Musicians from Indiana
Deaths from cancer in California
20th-century American musicians
20th-century double-bassists
20th-century American male musicians
American male jazz musicians
The Three Sounds members